John Lambie Black (23 December 1879 – 29 July 1963) was a Scottish professional golfer.

Black finished in a tie for second place with Bobby Jones in the 1922 U.S. Open, a stroke behind Gene Sarazen. Just over two weeks later, on 31 July, Black was involved in an automobile accident that nearly took his life.

His younger brother Davie was also a professional golfer.

Professional wins (4)
Note: This list may be incomplete.

1919 California State Open
1920 California State Open, Northern California Open
1930 Northern California PGA Championship

Results in major championships

Note: Black only played in the U.S. Open.

WD = Withdrew
"T" indicates a tie for a place

References

Scottish male golfers
Sportspeople from South Ayrshire
People from Troon
1879 births
1963 deaths